The Golden Echo is the second studio album by New Zealand recording artist Kimbra, released by Warner Bros. Records in the United States on 19 August 2014.

Background
Kimbra was inspired by Greek mythology for the album and spent time in a small sheep farm in the middle of Los Angeles. Kimbra went to the farm the day after the 2013 Grammys. "I'd been caught up with all the Grammy and Gotye stuff happening, and the touring, the constant affirmation— or praise, or criticism, or self-reflection— everywhere," she said. "You get wrapped up in it. Then here I was chilling with a bunch of sheep. And they don't give a crap who you are. You're not special to them. You spend time with them and there's this beautiful kind of harmony of how everything works in that environment. It was a really great space to create."

Cover
The cover and all the photographs of The Golden Echo's booklet were shot by Thom Kerr, who also directed the music video for "Miracle".

Reception

The Golden Echo received generally positive reviews from critics. On Metacritic, the album obtained a normalised score of 70 out of 100, based on reviews from 12 selected mainstream critics.

Track listing

Credits and personnel
Credits adapted from the liner notes of The Golden Echo

 Kimbra Johnson - vocals ; production 
 Matt Bellamy - guitar 
 Bilal - featured artist
 Mario Borgatta - assistant
 Ron Bruner - writer 
 Thundercat - writer 
 Keefus Ciancia - production 
 Martin Cooke - engineer
 Rich Costey - production ; executive producer; mixing
 Zachary Dawes - writer 
 Mark Foster - writer 
 Nicolas Fournier - engineer
 Fraser T. Smith - writer 
 Taylor Graves - writer and production 
 Nick Haussling - A&R
 Bo Hill - engineer
 John Hill - engineer

 Daniel Johns - writer 
 Thom Kerr - artwork and photography
 John Legend - writer 
 Bob Ludwig - mastering
 M-Phazes - production 
 Major Dudes - production 
 Timon Martin - writer 
 Sonny J. Mason - writer, drums 
 Stephen McQuinn - writer 
 Matt Morris - writer 
 Tyler Parkford - writer 
 Kaveh Rastegar - writer 
 John "JR" Robinson - drums
 Omar Rodríguez-López - guitar 
 Michael Shuman - writer 
 Surahn "Sid" Sidhu - writing and production 
 Alex Tenta - design and layout
 Dave Tozer - writing and production 
 Lenny Waronker - A&R
 Ben Weinman - guitar 
 Joel Whitley - writer 
 PolySlyme - writing and production

Charts

References

2014 albums
Kimbra albums
Warner Records albums